Marguerite Van Cook (née Martin) (born 1954) is an English artist, writer, musician/singer and filmmaker. She was born in Portsmouth, England and now resides in New York City on the Lower East Side, in the East Village. She attended Portsmouth College of Art and Design, Northumbria University Graphic and Fine Arts programs, BMCC, and Columbia University for English (BA) and Modern European Studies (MA). She currently attends the CUNY Graduate Center in the French PhD program. She has also served as an Adjunct Professor at Columbia University and the Fashion Institute of Technology (FIT) in New York.

Career

Music
Van Cook was the lead singer for The Innocents, a UK punk band, who toured as opening act for The Clash and  The Slits on the "Sort it Out Tour." After this group disbanded, she joined "Steppin' Razor," an all female reggae band, as the bass player. They opened for Yellowman at Harlem World.

Art career
Van Cook opened and ran Ground Zero Gallery NY with her partner James Romberger in the East Village Art scene, from 1983-1986. Among the gallery presentations was the David Wojnarowicz show Mexican Diaries, which informed the video "A Fire in My Belly," which sparked a controversy when it was removed from the exhibition Hide/Seek from the National Portrait Gallery in 2011. Under the banner of "Ground Zero", the couple curated and produced shows at Danceteria, Max Fish and other downtown clubs. In 1991, she became the director of Elston Fine Arts. In 2003, together with Romberger she directed the Fine Art elements of the Howl! Festival, an annual festival of the East Village, which included public outdoor sculpture exhibits, gallery shows. In 2006, she became the director and producer of the festival.

Van Cook has presented solo and group shows and her work is in many major public collections. Van Cook has presented works as a performance artist. She was part of a collaborative group curated by Carlo McCormick, which included, James Romberger, David West, Marilyn Minter, David Wojnarowicz, Christof Kolhofer, Keiko Bonk and Luis Frangella. Together they painted installations in New York and Virginia.

Film
Van Cook produced and directed the film Funky Shui in New York. Additionally, she appeared in David Wojnarowicz and Tommy Turner's film Where Evil Dwells, as well as taking the role of Red Snapper in Nick Zedd and Rev.Jen’s series Electra Elf.

Writing
While attending Columbia University, Van Cook won the Van Rensselaer Poetry Prize, previously won by notables such as John Berryman and Thomas Merton. Her book "Stigma" is in the "Joan Flasch Artists' Book Collection" and her periodical The Murdering Class was carried by art book distributors "Printed Matter". Other publications in which her work has appeared include "Peau Sensible", or "Sensitive Skin", "The Hooded Utilitarian" and in Sounds for whom she wrote music reviews.

Comics and graphic novels
Of her comics work, Van Cook is known for her color work on the graphic novel Seven Miles a Second, with Romberger and David Wojnarowicz. Van Cook was nominated for an Eisner Award in 2014 for her work on this book in the category of Best Painter/Multimedia Artist (interior art). The graphic novel was reprinted in 2013 as 7 Miles a Second by Fantagraphics Books publishers with amended color production. The original artwork was shown at the New Museum and the comic was included in the Museum of Modern Art "Open Ends, Millennium Show". In 2014 she wrote and colored The Late Child and Other Animals, a generational memoir, which was adapted and drawn by James Romberger and published by Fantagraphics Books. The story "Nature Lessons" from the  book received an Ignatz nomination for "Outstanding Story" in 2015.
She has worked for DC Comics as a writer and colorist. She has collaborated on a comic Ground Zero with James Romberger, which was serialized through the 1980s and 1990s in various downtown literary magazines.

References

External links

 Ground Zero comic
 The Arteries Group / Marguerite Van Cook
 The Official Friar Aylesbury Website

1954 births
Living people
American female comics artists
People from Manhattan
Alternative cartoonists
English punk rock singers
Women punk rock singers

People from the East Village, Manhattan